Croghan Island Mill is a historic saw mill complex and concrete dam located near Croghan in Lewis County, New York. The mill complex consists of three blocks; the mill building main block, cold storage block, and office block. The main block is a five-by-three-bay, -story gable-roofed structure sheathed in clapboard, approximately 30 feet by 56 feet in size. The cold storage block is a 1-story, gable-roofed addition to the north side of the main block. The office block is a -story, shed-roofed addition projecting south of the main block. The complex also includes the wheel house and flume box in a -story ell projecting off the main block. The concrete dam was built in 1906 and has an approximately 2-story drop.

It was listed on the National Register of Historic Places in 2010.

References

Industrial buildings and structures on the National Register of Historic Places in New York (state)
Buildings and structures in Lewis County, New York
National Register of Historic Places in Lewis County, New York